The Dakotas are a group of British musicians, which initially convened as a backing band in Manchester, England. Their original vocalist was Pete McLaine who Brian Epstein replaced with the singer Billy J. Kramer, a Liverpudlian who was the lead vocalist for the group during the 1960s. In the U.S., they are regarded as part of the British Invasion.

Career
The group's name arose from an engagement at the Plaza Ballroom in Oxford Street, Manchester. Their manager asked the group to return the next week dressed as Indians and called the Dakotas, founded in September 1960 by rhythm guitarist Robin MacDonald, with Bryn Jones on lead guitar; Tony Bookbinder (Elkie Brooks older brother, also known as Tony Mansfield) on drums, and Ian Fraser on bass. Ray Jones joined the band as bassist replacing Ian Fraser, and Mike Maxfield joined the band in February 1962 as lead guitarist replacing Bryn Jones after being with a Manchester band called the Coasters. The group first backed Pete MacLaine (February 1962 – January 1963). However, Brian Epstein, who was managing Billy J. Kramer, made the Dakotas an offer to become Kramer's backing band, which they accepted. Epstein insisted the name was "Billy J Kramer with the Dakotas", not "...and...".  The group and Billy J Kramer then went to Hamburg to perfect their act.

In addition to backing Kramer on his hits, the group itself is perhaps best known for their instrumental single called "The Cruel Sea", a composition of Maxfield that reached No.18 in the UK charts in July 1963. The track was re-titled "The Cruel Surf" in the U.S., and was subsequently covered by The Ventures.

The band released "Magic Carpet" by George Martin in September 1963. It was not a hit. Their next single, "Oyeh" (November 1964), was not a chart success either.

After a row with Epstein, Ray Jones left the group in July 1964. Robin MacDonald moved to bass to make way for a new lead guitarist, Mick Green from Johnny Kidd and the Pirates, and the band continued to record with Kramer and under their own name. Maxfield left to concentrate on songwriting in 1965, leaving the Dakotas as a trio, while ex-Pirate Frank Farley replaced Mansfield on drums in 1966. However, the decline of Kramer's career through alcoholism also caused the decline of the Dakotas' career. He parted from the group in September 1967, and the band folded the following year. MacDonald, Green and Farley then joined Cliff Bennett's backing band.

The Dakotas reformed in the late 1980s and recruited vocalist Eddie Mooney and session musician Toni Baker. After original drummer Tony Mansfield left to pursue a career in finance and Mike Maxfield suffered a stroke, drummer Pete Hilton and guitarist Alan Clare were added. In recent years, the band has appeared on nostalgia 1960s package tours in their own right, as well as backing artists such as Peter Noone of Herman's Hermits, Wayne Fontana and John Walker of the Walker Brothers. In 2004 the Dakotas worked with British comedian Peter Kay on hit TV series Phoenix Nights, and Max and Paddy. Toni Baker co-wrote all the music with Peter Kay.

In December 2007, Eddie Mooney was invited to front the Fortunes whose lead singer, Rod Allen died after a sudden illness. This led to him joining the band full-time. Since December 2010 the Dakotas gained a new bass player in Marius Jones, and a new frontman in Ronnie Ravey, taking the band back to the original formula of a 5 piece outfit.

The Dakotas still tour and record, but none of the members from the 1960s play with the group, although Mike Maxfield, the original guitarist, is still involved behind the scenes.

1960s personnel
 Tony Mansfield (born Anthony Bookbinder, 28 May 1943, (Brother of The British Queen of Blues Elkie Brooks.) Salford, Lancashire) – drummer
 Ian Fraser – bassist (1960 only)
 Bryn Jones – lead guitarist (up to February 1962)
 Robin MacDonald (born 18 July 1943, Nairn, Scotland died 9 September 2015) – rhythm guitarist / bassist (from September 1960 onwards)
 Ray Jones (born Raymond Jones, 22 October 1939, Oldham, Lancashire – died 20 January 2000) – bassist (up to July 1964)
 Mike Maxfield (born Michael Maxfield, 23 February 1944, Manchester) – lead guitarist
 Mick Green (born Michael Robert Green, 2 February 1944, Matlock, Derbyshire died 11 January 2010) – lead guitarist (from July 1964 onwards)
 Frank Farley (born Frank William Farley, 18 February 1942, Belgaum, British India) (from August 1966 onwards) – drummer
 Tony Reeve joined the band in 1962, and was one of the first left-handed bass guitarists in England, along with Paul McCartney. Reeve joined the band after spending many years in the police force as a civilian photographer, he then left the police force to work for a kitchen-fitting company and from there he was asked to join the band.

Additional information
 Tony Mansfield (Tony Bookbinder) is the brother of the British vocalist, Elkie Brooks (Elaine Bookbinder).
 Eddie Mooney appeared on PBS television in the U.S. as a member of The Walker Brothers.
Toni Baker co-wrote all the music with Peter Kay on hit TV series Phoenix Nights, and Max and Paddy's Road to Nowhere.

References

 Sleeve notes of Billy J Kramer with the Dakotas EP Collection 1995 Miles Records SEECD422

External links
 Official site
 The Zone online magazine featuring an interview with Toni Baker of the Dakotas

English pop music groups
Musical groups from Manchester
Beat groups
Musical groups established in 1962
Musical backing groups
1962 establishments in England
Parlophone artists
Imperial Records artists